Ectoedemia platanella, the sycamore leaf blotch miner, is a moth of the  family Nepticulidae. It is found in the eastern parts of the United States.

The wingspan is 5.5–7 mm.

The larvae feed on Platanus species. They mine the leaves of their host plant. The mine consists of a narrow entrance and is filled with frass in the center. The mine has the appearance of a brown, circular blotch just below the leaf cuticle. Heavily mined leaves may drop prematurely.

External links
Nepticulidae of North America
Sycamore leafblotch miner at forestpests

Nepticulidae
Leaf miners
Moths of North America
Moths described in 1861